Circles is the second collaborative album by Porcupine Tree drummer Gavin Harrison and multi-instrumentalist, vocalist and extended-range bass player 05Ric. It was released on the Burning Shed record label in 2009.

Reception
A review in the December 2009 issue of Drummer Magazine states "Although the music itself is complex, it feels great and retains a sense of space and atmosphere, while Gavin and Ric show themselves to be two of the most inventive musicians around, still retaining the highest level of musicality."

Track listing
 "Circles" – 4:29
 "Source" – 5:49
 "Last Call" – 3:32
 "Crisis" – 3:42
 "Faith" – 5:03
 "Scar" – 4:00
 "Break" – 4:55
 "Beyond The 'A'" – 3:56 
 "Eye" – 3:33
 "Goodbye" – 3:21

All songs written by Gavin Harrison & 05Ric

Personnel
Gavin Harrison – drums, guitar & bass 
05Ric – extended-range bass & vocals

References

External links
GH05ric MySpace page
www.burningshed.com

2009 albums
Collaborative albums